David Bradley is a linguist who specializes in the Tibeto-Burman languages of Southeast Asia. Born in the United States, Bradley was educated at the SOAS, University of London. He has spent most of his career in Australia and is currently professor emeritus at La Trobe University. Bradley has been an invited lecturer and keynote speaker many times and throughout the world, in particular the Himalayan Languages Symposium and the International Conference on Sino-Tibetan Languages and Linguistics.

He is also the chief editor of the journal Linguistics of the Tibeto-Burman Area.

Publications
Bradley, David (1979). Lahu Dialects. (Oriental Monograph 23). Canberra: Faculty of Asian Studies and Australian National University Press.
Bradley, David (1979). Proto-Loloish. (Scandinavian Institute of Asian Studies Monograph Series 39). London and Malmo: Curzon Press.
Bradley, David (1979). "Speech through music: the Sino-Tibetan gourd reed-organ' Bulletin of the School of Oriental and African Studies" XLII/3: 535-540 1979
 D Bradley & M Bradley (1984). "Problems of Asian Students in Australia: language, culture and education." Canberra: Australian Government Publishing Service.
 Language Policy, Language Planning and Sociolinguistics in South-East Asia. (ed.) Canberra: Pacific Linguistics A-67 1985
 M Rado, L Foster & D Bradley English Language Needs of Migrant and Refugee Youth. Canberra: Australian Government Publishing Service 1986
 Burmese Phrasebook. Melbourne: Lonely Planet Publications 1988
 D Bradley, R D Sussex & G K Scott (eds) Studies in Australian English. Bundoora: Department of Linguistics, La Trobe University for the Australian Linguistic Society 1989
 D Bradley, P Lewis, C Court & N Jarkey. Thailand Hill Tribes Phrasebook. Melbourne: Lonely Planet 1991
 Country Education Profiles: Myanmar. Canberra: Australian Government Publishing Service 1992
 A Dictionary of the Northern Dialect of Lisu. Canberra: Pacific Linguistics C-126 1994
 Bradley, David (1995). Studies in Burmese Languages. (ed.) Canberra: Pacific Linguistics A-83.
 Bradley, David (1997). Burmese Phrasebook. 2nd edition. Melbourne: Lonely Planet.
 Bradley, David (1997). Tibeto-Burman Languages of the Himalayas. (ed.) Canberra: Pacific Linguistics A-86
 Bradley, David et al. Southeast Asian Phrasebook. Melbourne: Lonely Planet 1997
 Bradley, David & M. Bradley (eds) Language Endangerment and Language Maintenance Lon
 Bradley, David (1980)'Phonological convergence between languages in contact: Mon-Khmer structural borrowing in Burmese' Berkeley Linguistics Society 6: 259-26
 Bradley, David  (1983) 'Identity: the persistence of minority groups' In J McKinnon and W Bhruksasri (eds) Highlanders of Thailand, 46-55. Kuala Lumpur: Oxford University Press 1983; paperback edition 1986
 'Traditional minorities and language education in Thailand' In Bradley (ed.), 87-102 1985
 M Bradley & D Bradley 'Asian students' comprehension of Australian English' In M G Clyne (ed.) Australia, Meeting Place of Languages. Pacific Linguistics C-92, 171-181 1985
 'Language planning for China's minorities: the Yi branch' In D C Laycock and W Winter (eds) A World of Language: papers presented to Professor S. A. Wurm on his 65th birthday. Pacific Linguistics C-100, 81-89 1987
 Bradley, David  (1988). 'The disappearance of the Ugong in Thailand' In N C Dorian (ed.) Investigating Obsolescence, 33-40. Cambridge: Cambridge U. Press.
 Bradley, David  (1989) 'Regional dialects in Australian English phonology' In P Collins & D Blair (eds) Australian English: the language of a new society. St. Lucia: U. of Queensland Press 260-270
 Bradley, David  (1989) 'Uncles and aunts: Burmese kinship and gender' In J H C S Davison (ed.) Festschrift for E. J. A. Henderson, 147-162. London: School of Oriental and African Studies 1989
 Bradley, David  ('/æ/ and /a:/ in Australian English' In J Cheshire (ed.) English Around the World: sociolinguistic perspectives, 227-234. Cambridge: Cambridge U. Press 1991
 Bradley, David  (1991) 'Chinese as a pluricentric language' In M G Clyne (ed.) Pluricentric Languages, 305-324. Berlin: Mouton de Gruyter 1991
 'Building identity and the modernisation of language: minority language policy in Thailand and China' In A. Gomes (ed.) Modernity and Identity: Asian Illustrations, 192-205. Bundoora: Institute of Asian Studies, La Trobe University for Asian Studies Association of Australia 1994
 Minority language policy and endangered languages in China and Southeast Asia. In K. Matsumura (ed.) Studies in Endangered Languages, 49-83. Tokyo: Hituzi Syobo 1998
 D. Bradley & M. Bradley Changing attitudes to Australian English. In D. Blair & P. Collins (eds) English in Australia, 271-285. Amsterdam: Benjamins 2001
 "Language Policy for the Yi." In Stevan Harrell (ed.) Perspectives on the Yi of Southwest China, 195-214. Berkeley: University of California Press 2001; Chinese translation appeared in Bamo Ayi (ed.) Papers in Yi Studies, 107-133. Kunming: Yunnan Agricultural Press 2000
 Counting the family: family group classifiers in Yi Branch languages. Anthropological
 "Attitudes to languages: the key factor in language endangerment." In O. Sakiyama (ed.) Lectures on Endangered Languages 2: 151-161. Endangered Languages of the Pacific Rim Series C002. Kyoto: Nakanishi 2001.
 "Tibeto-Burman lexicography." In R. Job et al. (eds) Lexikographie. Berlin: Mouton de Gruyter to appear 2002
 Sociolinguistics in Southeast Asia. In P. Trudgill et al. (eds) Soziolinguistik. Berlin: Mouton de Gruyter to appear 2002
 "Southeast and East Asia." In M. Brenzinger (ed.) Language Diversity Endangered.'' Berlin: Mouton de Gruyter to appear 2002

References

External links
Faculty page at La Trobe University

Academic staff of La Trobe University
Living people
Linguists from the United States
Linguists of Sino-Tibetan languages
Linguists of Loloish languages
Year of birth missing (living people)
Alumni of SOAS University of London